Bid Boland or Bid-e Boland may refer to:
 Bid Boland, Bushehr
 Bid Boland, Khuzestan